The Kamengrad Coal Mine is a coal mine located in the Una-Sana Canton. The mine has coal reserves amounting to 284.7 million tonnes of lignite, one of the largest coal reserves in Europe and the world. The mine has an annual production capacity of 0.4 million tonnes of coal.
Mine provides fuel to Kamengrad lignite power plant.

References 

Coal mines in Bosnia and Herzegovina
Una-Sana Canton